Grace and Truth is a novel by Irish writer Jennifer Johnston, first published in 2005 by Headline Books.

Plot introduction
On returning to her home in Goatstown, Dublin after a successful European stage tour, actress Sally is shocked when her husband Charlie announces he is leaving her. Sally finds herself alone and determines to discover the truth about her family...

External links
A humane triumph over shame and evasion review from The Independent
review from The Times by Penelope Lively
Applause and a thunderclap review from The Telegraph
RTE clip Fiona Looney, Eleanor McEvoy and Ita Daly discuss Jennifer Johnston's Grace and Truth

2005 Irish novels
Novels about actors
Novels by Jennifer Johnston
Novels set in Dublin (city)
Headline Publishing Group books